Mary Beatrice Klass (born 16 May 1935) is a Singaporean former sprinter. She competed in the women's 100 metres at the 1956 Summer Olympics. Klass won a silver medal in the 100 metres at the 1954 Asian Games. She is a Eurasian of Dutch and Portuguese descent. In 2016, Klass was inducted to the Singapore Women's Hall of Fame in 2016.

References

External links
 
 

1935 births
Living people
Singaporean female sprinters
Olympic athletes of Singapore
Athletes (track and field) at the 1954 Asian Games
Asian Games silver medalists for Singapore
Asian Games medalists in athletics (track and field)
Medalists at the 1954 Asian Games
Athletes (track and field) at the 1956 Summer Olympics
Singaporean people of Dutch descent
Singaporean people of Portuguese descent
Place of birth missing (living people)
Olympic female sprinters
20th-century Singaporean women